The 2018 Central African Republic League season is the top level of football competition in Central African Republic.

Teams
A total of 12 teams participate in the Ligue de Bangui Première Division. The season started on 21 February 2018.

Halfway standings (18 June 2018): 

Top two (30 September 2018): 
Stade Centrafricaine
Anges de Fatima

References

Football leagues in the Central African Republic
League
Central African Republic